Desmond White (28 September 1911 – 21 June 1985) was a Scottish amateur footballer who made over 100 appearances in the Scottish League for Queen's Park as a goalkeeper. He later served as chairman of Celtic.

Personal life 
White was the son of Celtic director Thomas White and was the father of Celtic director Chris White. He served as a flight lieutenant in the Royal Air Force during the Second World War and permanently lost the use of his right arm after an accident. He died while on holiday in Crete in June 1985.

Career statistics

References

Scottish footballers
Scottish Football League players
Queen's Park F.C. players
Association football goalkeepers
Footballers from Glasgow
1911 births
1985 deaths
Scotland amateur international footballers
Celtic F.C. directors and chairmen
Royal Air Force personnel of World War II
Edinburgh City F.C. (1928) players
Royal Air Force officers
20th-century Scottish businesspeople